The Nandi Award for Best Music Director winners since 1977.

References

Music Director